Daniel Merriam is a contemporary surrealist and is best known for his dry brush technique and imaginative style.

Biography 

Merriam grew up in York Harbor, Maine and is one of seven children. He studied mechanical and architectural design at Central Maine Vocational Technical Institute. He later worked for his family’s design and construction business and as an architectural and commercial illustrator. He had his first solo exhibition as a fine artist at Abacus Gallery in Maine in 1987.

Merriam has produced paintings for the covers of books by Paula Volsky and Neal Barrett Jr. published by Bantam Books, as well as for the Mid-American Review. His work was also used on the playbill of A Midsummer Night’s Dream by William Shakespeare produced by the McCarter Theatre in New Jersey. He published two catalogs of collections of his paintings in 1998 and 2007, which are both part of the permanent archives at the Los Angeles County Museum of Art, the National Museum of American Illustration, and the Peninsular Museum of Art.

He has had exhibitions in the United States, Europe and the Middle East. Merriam’s work is included in the public collections of The Riverside Museum of Art, Merrill Lynch, The Gesundheit! Institute, the Manhattan Club, among others.

Recognitions

Merriam’s awards include several first-place Broderson Awards and the first-place New England Scholastics Press Association Award for editorial cartooning. In 1987, he received an Honorary Masters of Humane Letters from the University of New England in recognition of the potential social contribution of his work.

References

External links

de Daniel Merriam's facebook page
bubblestreetgallery
The Thinker's Garden

Further reading

 Gratusse, Delphine. D. Merriam Conte Ses Toiles au Château de Belcastel. Centre Presse, August 11, 2009.
 N.F.. L’Artiste Qui Hante le Château. La Depeche, August 9, 2009.
 Routhe, Philippe. Daniel Merriam, Maître du Réalism Imaginaire. Midi Libre, August 2, 2009.
 Narayan,  Meena. Flights of Fantasy. Gulf Connoisseur, Anniversary Issue, April/May, 2009.
 Haber, Karen. Freedom Starts in the Mind. Realms of Fantasy, February 2009.
 Dina Butti. Tangible Imaginables. Talise, January–February 2009, Issue 5.
 Rossi, Carrie. Frames of Reference. In New York Magazine, January 2009.
 Gardner, Nadia. Quick Chat: Daniel Merriam. OK! Middle East, December 11, 2008, Issue 200.
 Chan, Erin Szeto. Dream World. In New York Magazine, December 2007.
 Kayal, Michele. His Own Fantasia. Art & Antiques, December 2003.
 Abbott, Ann Emmert. What Kind of Creative Are You? Watercolor Magic, June 2001.
 Ditchoff, Pamela. Daniel Merriam. Ego Magazine, premier issue 2000.
 Mendenhall, Lauri. Unexpected Puppeteers. Coast Magazine, November 1999.
 Fallon, Daniel. Into the Depth of Surrealism. Watercolor Magic, Spring 1999.
 Sedley, Jeremy. Daniel Merriam. New Art International, Volume IV, 1998–1999.
 Grenier, Cynthia. Daniel Merriam: Visual Thought. The World & I, November 1995.

Catalogues raisonné
 Taking Reality by Surprise. San Francisco: Monarch Editions, Inc., 2010. 
 The Art of Daniel Merriam: The Eye of a Dreamer, 1997–2007. San Francisco: Monarch Editions, Inc., 2007. 
 The Art of Daniel Merriam: The Impetus of Dreams, 1988–1997. San Francisco: Monarch Editions, Inc., 1998. 

Living people
1963 births
People from York, Maine
20th-century American painters
American male painters
21st-century American painters
21st-century American male artists
Artists from Maine
People from Naples, Maine
Central Maine Community College alumni
20th-century American male artists